Pystynen is a surname. Notable people with the name include:

Aulis Pystynen (1928–1996), Finnish middle-distance runner
Erkki Pystynen (born 1929), Finnish professor and politician
Paavo Pystynen (1932–2021), Finnish long-distance runner
Ville Pystynen, Finnish musician

Finnish-language surnames